Ski jumping has been included in the program of every Winter Olympic Games.  From 1924 through to 1956, the competition involved jumping from one hill whose length varied from each edition of the games to the next.

Most historians have placed this length at 70 meters and have classified this as the large hill. (Recent information from the FIS offices in Switzerland have had the K-points from 1924 to 1956 determined as shown below). In 1960, the ski jump hill was standardized to 80 meters. In 1964, a second ski jump, the normal hill at 70 meters (K90) was added along with the 80 meters (K120) large hill. The length of the large hill run in 1968 increased from 80 meters to 90 meters (K120).  The team large hill event was added in 1988. By 1992, the ski jumping competitions were referred by their K-point distances rather than their run length prior to launching from the ski jump (90 meters for the normal hill and 120 meters for the large hill, respectively) and have been that way ever since. For the 2006 Winter Olympics, the normal hill was designated as HS106 (K95) while the large hill was designated as HS140 (K125).

On April 6, 2011, the International Olympic Committee officially accepted women's ski jumping into the official Olympic program for the 2014 Winter Olympics in Sochi, Russia. On February 11, 2014, Carina Vogt of Germany won the first gold medal for women's ski jumping at the Winter Olympic Games.

Events

Medal table 

Sources (after the 2022 Winter Olympics):
Accurate as of 2022 Winter Olympics.

Note: a tie for silver and no bronze medal in the 1980 normal hill competition.

Number of ski jumpers by nation 

1 Athletes did not start at the Games.

See also
List of Olympic venues in ski jumping

References 

 Wallenchinsky, David (1984). Ski Jump, 90-meter Hill. The Complete Book of The Olympics.

External links 

 FIS Ski jumping results at the Winter Olympics

 
Sports at the Winter Olympics
Skiing at the Winter Olympics

Olympics